Terry Lee Landrum (born October 25, 1954) is a former professional baseball player who played in Major League Baseball (MLB) primarily as an outfielder from 1980 to 1988.

Biography
Landrum was born in Joplin, Missouri. He graduated from Highland High School in Albuquerque, New Mexico.

Landrum was acquired by the Baltimore Orioles on August 31, 1983, the last day for player postseason eligibility. This was the completion of a transaction from  months prior when the Orioles sent Floyd Rayford to the St. Louis Cardinals on June 13. Landrum hit the game-winning home run for the Orioles in the final game of the 1983 American League Championship Series.   He was a very late addition to the Orioles post-season roster, and such an unlikely hero that teammate John Lowenstein joked that he was not sure of Landrum's first name.

Landrum also played well in the 1985 National League Championship Series and 1985 World Series for the St. Louis Cardinals, subbing for an injured Vince Coleman.  He hit well over .300 in the postseason and had a home run in game four of the World Series. Landrum played winter ball with the Cardenales de Lara club of the Venezuelan League during three seasons spanning 1981–1983.

Although a below average hitter in his career, in 607 games compiling a .249 batting average with 13 home runs and 111 RBI over 9 seasons, Landrum was an excellent outfielder. In 2330 innings, (including one game at first base) he recorded a .992 fielding percentage, committing only 5 errors in 634 total chances. He was a strong hitter in the postseason, compiling a .347 batting average (17-for-49) with 7 runs, 2 home runs and 6 RBI in 19 games.

Landrum also played for the West Palm Beach Tropics and the St. Petersburg Pelicans of the Senior Professional Baseball Association in the 1989 and 1990 seasons, respectively. He played in the Mexican League with the Charros de Jalisco, in 1991.

After baseball, Landrum attended New York University and earned a physical therapy degree. In 1998, he became a physical therapist, with a practice in New York City.  He was NYU Baseball's hitting coach.

References

External links
, or Retrosheet
Pelota Binaria (Venezuelan Winter League)
 

1954 births
Living people
African-American baseball players
Arkansas Travelers players
Baltimore Orioles players
Baseball players from Missouri
Cardenales de Lara players
American expatriate baseball players in Venezuela
Charros de Jalisco players
Los Angeles Dodgers players
Louisville Redbirds players
Major League Baseball left fielders
Major League Baseball right fielders
Miami Miracle players
Nashville Sounds players
New York University alumni
Oklahoma City 89ers players
Orangeburg Cardinals players
American physiotherapists
Rochester Red Wings players
Sportspeople from Joplin, Missouri
Springfield Redbirds players
St. Louis Cardinals players
St. Petersburg Cardinals players
St. Petersburg Pelicans players
Tulsa Oilers (baseball) players
West Palm Beach Tropics players
21st-century African-American people
20th-century African-American sportspeople
Eastern Oklahoma Mountaineers baseball players